Abdullah Marafee (born 13 April 1992) is a Qatari footballer who plays as a midfielder for Al-Arabi, the same club he signed on with as a youth player. He has yet to score a goal in match play.

References

External links
 

Qatari footballers
1992 births
Living people
Association football midfielders
Al-Arabi SC (Qatar) players
Qatar Stars League players